REN TV is a Russian free-to-air television network, was founded on 1 January 1997 by Irena Lesnevskaya and her son, Dmitry Lesnevsky, who had been running REN TV as a production house for other national Russian television channels. Though it focuses mostly on audiences aged between 18 and 45 years old, the network offers programming for a wide range of demographics.

REN TV's network is a patchwork of 406 independent broadcasting companies in Russia and the CIS. REN TV's signal is received in 718 towns and cities in Russia - from Kaliningrad in the West to Yuzhno-Sakhalinsk in the East. It has a potential audience of 113.5 million viewers (officially 120 million viewers
with more than 12 million of them living in  Moscow city and Moscow Oblast (Moscow Region). REN TV works with 10 broadcaster affiliates and 19 cable operators in the CIS and the Baltic states; 181 cities can receive REN TV's signal.

Ownership

Until 1 July 2005 the channel belonged to its founder Irena Lesnevskaya and her son (30%) and the Russian utility RAO UES headed by Anatoly Chubais. In 2005 Bertelsmann's RTL bought 30% of REN TV with steel maker Severstal and oil and natural gas company Surgutneftegaz each buying 35%.

Severstal's Alexey Germanovich on 18 December 2006 ceded the chairperson of REN TV's board to Lyubov Sovershaeva, President Vladimir Putin's former deputy envoy to the North-West federal okrug and chairperson of the board at ABRos Investments, a subsidiary of St Petersburg's Russia bank. ABRos had bought a considerable stake in REN. The bank, whose chairman, Yury Kovalchuk, was a close friend of President Vladimir Putin, owned 38% of its home town's TRK Petersburg TV channel – and was likely to buy more of that company, analysts had told 19 December 2006's Kommersant-daily. REN TV and TRK Petersburg would merge into a single media holding, though they would operate independently, industry observers had told the daily.

Russian media had reported that oil and gas group Surgutneftegaz had sold its stake in the channel to ABRos, which had increased its stake in the media company from 45% to 70%. '[T]here are indications that Bertelsmann was interested in selling up, after about 18 months in the Russian TV market,' the broadcasting news website added.

Currently National Media Group owns 82%, and Russian state oil company Gazprom subsidiary SOGAZ owns 18%.

Logos

News coverage
In November 2005 REN TV fired Olga Romanova, the anchor of its daily 24 news flagship. Despite much publicity around the incident, her independent manner of reporting was continued by Marianna Maksimovskaya, formerly an anchor and news presenter for Vladimir Gusinsky's NTV Station.  Maksimovskaya was in charge of news broadcasts on REN TV until 2014, when she was fired. Due to her activities, the channel was arguably Russia's only major TV outlet with liberal views, discussing the problem of state censorship and showing interviews with leaders of the political fringe (including Other Russia).

Prior to her departure from the channel, Romanova had told the Radio Free Europe on 25 November 2005 that the channel's head, Alexander Ordzhonikidze had pulled two recent stories for, she felt, political reasons. One censored item had covered an investigation into Defence Minister Sergei Ivanov's son's involvement in a road accident in which a woman died. Romanova spoken about the alleged censorship on Ekho Moskvy radio on 23 November 2005 – and the next day Ordzhonikidze barred from entering the channel's building. A second 'banned item had been about the building in central Moscow of a US$15 million church and clock tower by Zurab Tsereteli, the International Press Institute noted in its report on 2005.

Ordzhonikidze said in an interview for Echo of Moscow radio station that REN's news output had low ratings and management had decided to try other anchors on the evening newscasts. "Besides, it's hard for one person to anchor all the nightly newscasts every day of the week. [They] might just feel ill," he had added.

In solidarity with Romanova, several of her journalist colleagues quit the channel in December 2005. Head of news and deputy channel director, Yelena Fedorova, told Radio Liberty's Russian Service (Radio Svoboda) why she had resigned. "A lot of content-related directives have passed by me. As a journalist, I cannot put up with that, I cannot live with that," she told state news agency RIA Novosti on 5 December 2005. Editor Olga Shorina and producer Tatyana Kolokova were also planning to leave the channel because, they said, it was impossible to perform their professional duties.

Scheduled content
The company which produced several high-profile feature films, notably the Golden Lion-winning Vozvrashcheniye in 2003, is still a production house and has made much of the network's scheduled content, including numerous TV series:

Soldiers, following recruits drafted into the Russian Army for their mandatory year of military service. 16 seasons .
Students, following the social lives of several Moscow University for the Humanities students. (2005-2006)
Tourists, following several couples on vacation on a beach resort in Turkey. (2005)

List of television series, studio taken FOX and Sony Pictures Television.
REN also was showing purchased programming, including:
Prison Break (as Побег) since September 4, 2006
Family Guy (as Гриффины)
Friends (as Друзья)
M*A*S*H (as МЭШ)
My Name Is Earl (as Меня зовут Эрл) since 2006 
Supernatural (as Сверхъестественное) since September 2006
The 4400 (as 4400) since November 26, 2006
The Simpsons (as Симпсоны)
The X-Files (as Секретные материалы)
Jetix, children's adventure programming from Disney

Current purchased/licensed programming:
Persons Unknown (as Неизвестные лица) since November 2012
Top Gear Russia since February 22, 2009

Other shows include at the moment:
 Граница Времени (The Edge of Time) - self-produced science fiction series, airs from 2015

Criticism 
REN TV has been accused of combining pieces of scientific shows and interviews to produce pseudoscientific "documentaries". In 2015, REN TV's documentaries were awarded "the most harmful pseudoscientific project (for spreading of myths, delusions and superstitions)" antiprize by the Ministry of Education and Science for propaganda of conspiracy theories and mistrust for science.

References

External links 
 

 
Mass media companies of France
Mass media companies of Russia
Companies based in Paris
Companies based in Moscow
Russian-language television stations in Russia
Television channels and stations established in 1997
1997 establishments in Russia